The 2014 Balkan Athletics Championships was the 67th edition of the annual track and field competition for athletes from the Balkans, organised by Balkan Athletics. It was held at Stadionul Nicolae Dobrin in Pitești, Romania on 26 and 27 July. The host nation Romania topped the medal table with fourteen gold medals among a total haul of 32. Turkey and Bulgaria each won seven gold medals.

Athletes' performances were assessed with a points ranking based on international standards in the given event. Romanian long jumper Alina Rotaru gave the best overall performance with 6.72 m for 1143 points and her countryman Marian Oprea gave the best men's performance with 16.77 m for 1130 points in the triple jump.

Turkey's Ramil Guliyev won a double in the men's short sprints and Marian Oprea was the victor in both men's horizontal jumps. The individual 400 metres champions, Yavuz Can and Bianca Răzor, both anchored their national teams to a second gold in the 4 × 400 metres relay. Bulgaria's Inna Eftimova fell just short of a women's short sprint double, winning the 200 metres and taking silver in the 100 metres. Bulgarian jumper Andriana Bânova and Moldovan thrower Dimitriana Surdu each won multiple individual medals.

Results

Men

Women

Medal table

References

Results
73rd Balkan Senior Championships. Balkan Athletics. Retrieved 2019-08-03.

2014
Sport in Pitești
International athletics competitions hosted by Romania
Balkan Athletics Championships
Balkan Athletics Championships
Balkan Athletics Championships